Dumbrava Roșie is a commune in Neamț County, Western Moldavia, Romania. It is composed of four villages: Brășăuți, Cut, Dumbrava Roșie and Izvoare.

References

Communes in Neamț County
Localities in Western Moldavia